Operation Budapest was a joint investigation between the Italian Carabinieri, the Hungarian police and the Greek police.

On 5 November 1983 the following works were stolen from the Museum of Fine Arts in Budapest

 Self-portrait, Giorgione
 Esterhazy Madonna, Raffaello Sanzio
 Portrait of a Gentleman, Tintoretto
 Portrait of a Gentlewoman, Tintoretto
 Madonna and Saints, Giambattista Tiepolo
 Rest on the Flight into Egypt, Giambattista Tiepolo

They were all recovered in the sacred shrine of Panagia Trypiti in Aigio, Greece.

References

Bibliography
Comando Carabinieri - TPC, Anno Operativo 2001, Edizioni De Luca, Roma 2001

Filmography
 Operation Budapest - A crime of art, 2019, documentary directed by Gilberto Martinelli.

Art crime
Individual thefts
1983 crimes in Hungary
1983 in Italy
1980s in Budapest
Crime in Budapest
Museum crime